Magele Mauiliu Magele is a former Samoan politician and Cabinet Minister. He is a member of the Human Rights Protection Party.

Magele is a former Vice Chancellor of the National University of Samoa. He was first elected to the Fono at the 2011 Samoan general election, and appointed Minister of Education, Sports and Culture. Following his election he was briefly suspended as a Minister pending the hearing of an electoral petition for bribery, but returned to work in May 2011. In 2013 he was recognised by the World Education Congress for his "Outstanding Contribution to Education".

Magele lost his seat at the 2016 election. Following his election loss he was appointed Trade & Investment Commissioner at the Samoan consulate in Auckland, New Zealand.

References

Members of the Legislative Assembly of Samoa
Living people
Government ministers of Samoa
Education ministers of Samoa
Human Rights Protection Party politicians
Academic staff of the National University of Samoa
Year of birth missing (living people)